I Keep Thinking It's Tuesday is the 1987 album by Doctor and the Medics.

UK track listing

Side One
"Drive... He Said" – 3:42
"Wild Flowers"  – 3:46
"Gorilla" – 4:06
"Jack of Kent"  – 3:56
"When the Hammer Comes Down" – 3:22
"Sea of Stone"  – 3:47
All songs written by Doctor/McGuire/Searle/West/Ritchie.

Side Two
"More" – 3:50
"Madman of Bernarae" – 3:10
"I Keep Thinking It's Tuesday" – 3:03
"Love and Everything You Eat"  – 3:01
"I Wanna Choke on Your Love" – 3:22
"Burning Love" *  – 3:46
All songs written by Doctor/McGuire/Searle/West/Ritchie, except * written by Dennis Linde

US track listing

Side One
"More" – 3:52
"Burning Love" * - 3:06
"I Wanna Choke on Your Love" – 3:22
"I Keep Thinking It's Tuesday" – 3:03
"Waterloo" ** - 3:19
All songs written by Doctor/McGuire/Searle/West/Ritchie, except, * written by Dennis Linde & ** written by Benny Andersson / Stig Anderson / Björn Ulvaeus

Side Two
"Drive He Said…" - 3:35
"Wild Flowers" – 3:46
"Gorilla" – 4:06
"When the Hammer Comes Down" – 3:22
"Sea of Stone" – 3:47
All songs written by Doctor/McGuire/Searle/West/Ritchie

Personnel
Doctor and the Medics
 The Doctor (Clive Jackson) – lead vocals
 Steve McGuire – guitar, keyboards
 Richard Searle – bass guitar
 Steve "Vom" Ritchie – drums
with:
 Wendi and Colette Annadin – backing vocals
 Julian Kershaw - brass arrangements
 Davey Payne - saxophone on "Tuesday"

Singles

This album produced two singles, with a supporting music video for "More"

"More"

7-inch UK single: "More" / "Bad Men's Pennies" – IRM139 IRS Records Ltd. (1987)
( Both songs credited to Doctor-McGuire-Searle-West-Ritchie )

12-inch UK single: "More" – IRMT139 IRS Records Ltd. (1987)
 A "More"
 B "More Again" ( "More ( 7" Mix)")
 B "Bad Men's Pennies"
 B "Pretty Little Henry"
( All songs credited to Doctor-McGuire-Searle-West-Ritchie )

"Drive he Said…"

7-inch UK single: "Drive He Said…" / "Ride The Beetle ( Live )" - IRM154 IRS Records Ltd. (1988)
( Both songs credited to Doctor-McGuire-Searle-West-Ritchie )

12-inch UK single: "Drive He Said…" - IRMT154 IRS Records Ltd. (1988)
 A "Drive He Said ( Extended Mix )" – 4:52
 A "Ride The Beetle ( Live )" – 3:45
 B "Medics Megahits Megamix" ( "Drive He Said…"/"Burn"/"Spirit In The Sky" * ) - 5:22
 B "Derive He Said…" - 3:35
( All songs credited to Doctor-McGuire-Searle-West-Ritchie, except, "Spirit In The Sky" by Norman Greenbaum )

1987 albums
I.R.S. Records albums
Doctor and the Medics albums